The 2015–16 Wyoming Cowgirls basketball team represents the University of Wyoming in the 2015–16 college basketball season. The Cowgirls are led by thirteenth year head coach Joe Legerski. The Cowgirls played their home games at the Arena-Auditorium and were members of the Mountain West Conference. They finished the season 13–16, 6–12 in Mountain West play to finish in a tie for eighth place. They lost in the first round of the Mountain West women's tournament to San Diego State.

Roster

Statistics
Source:

Schedule

|-
!colspan=9 style="background:#492f24; color:#ffc425;"| Exhibition

|-
!colspan=9 style="background:#492f24; color:#ffc425;"| Non-conference regular season

|-
!colspan=9 style="background:#492f24; color:#ffc425;"| Mountain West regular season

|-
!colspan=9 style="background:#492f24; color:#ffc425;"| Mountain West Women's Tournament

See also
2015–16 Wyoming Cowboys basketball team

References 

Wyoming Cowgirls basketball seasons
Wyoming Cowgirls
Wyoming Cowgirls